The Mat-Su Valley Frontiersman is a newspaper serving the Matanuska-Susitna Valley of Alaska. It is owned by Wick Communications, publishing every Sunday, Wednesday, and Friday. 

Former Alaska governor and vice-presidential candidate Sarah Palin worked for the newspaper as a sports reporter. 

Longtime sports writer Jeremiah Bartz is the managing editor.

References

External links
 

1947 establishments in Alaska
Matanuska-Susitna Borough, Alaska
Newspapers published in Alaska
Publications established in 1947